The Leaning Tower and Other Stories is a collection of nine works of short fiction by Katherine Anne Porter, published by Harcourt, Brace & Company in 1944. The stories also appear in The Collected Stories of Katherine Anne Porter (1965).

The Stories

The original date of publication for those stories that appeared in print before they were collected are listed along with the journal.:

“The Source” (Accent, Spring 1941)
“The Witness” (The Southern Review, Winter 1936)
“The Circus” (The Southern Review, 1935)
“The Journey” (The Southern Review, Winter 1936)
“The Last Leaf” (Virginia Quarterly Review, January 1935)
“The Grave” (Virginia Quarterly Review, April 1935)
“The Downward Path to Wisdom” (Harpers Bizarre, December 1939)
“A Day’s Work” (The Nation, February 10, 1940)
“The Leaning Tower” (The Southern Review, 1941)

Reviews

Contemporary criticism of the collection was mixed, offering praise as well as caveats.

Diana Trilling in The Nation declared that the volume surpassed Porter’s earlier short fiction collections.  Theodore Spencer of The Sewanee Review wrote: “Miss Porter’s Leaning Tower, following her other works of short fiction, has placed her at the top level of contemporary American fiction.” Orville Prescott in the New York Times considered some of the stories “almost masterpieces”, adding that the volume “is not so impressive as the two earlier volumes [Flowering Judas and other Stories (1935), Pale Horse, Pale Rider (1939)]...Exquisite as these stories are, they all are so slight, so inconclusive, so insubstantial [that] they are strangely unsatisfactory.”

Edward A. Weeks in The Atlantic Monthly wrote: “Nothing much happens in these stories. The people do little to excite your curiosity, or deepen your sympathy. One must respect the sheer virtuosity of Miss Porter’s prose…But style without warmth can be a tedious affair.”

Glenway Wescott of The New York Times Book Review ranked Porter with the upper echelon of American short fiction: “As it appears at present two of our top story writers stand head and shoulders above the rest,  Hemingway and Katherine Anne Porter…Miss Porter’s style is, so to speak, perfection…”

Theme

Whereas Porter introduced the character Miranda in “Pale Horse, Pale Rider” as a young woman, in The Leaning Tower and Other Stories, Porter resumes her examination of the child Miranda she had developed in “Old Mortality.”
Literary critic Edmund Wilson wrote:

The household and its members clearly resemble that of Porter’s own early biography. Indeed, according to critic Harold Bloom “Miranda [is] Porter’s own surrogate in her fiction” and “the closest thing to a spokesman that Porter allows herself” according to Howard Moss.

Footnotes

Sources 

 Bloom, Harold. 1986. Katherine Anne Porter: Modern Critical Views. Chelsea House Publishers, New York. 
Howard Moss  |Moss, Howard. 1965. The Collected Stories: A Poet of the Story in Critical Essays on Katherine Anne Porter (1997). Editor, Darlene Harbour Unrue. G. K. Hall and Company, New York. 
Porter, Katherine Anne. 2009. Katherine Anne Porter: Collected Stories and Other Writings. Literary Classics of the United States, New York. The Library of America Series (2009). 
  Schwartz, Edward. 1953. Katherine Anne Porter: A Critical Bibliography. The Folcroft Press, Inc., Forcroft, PA. Reprinted from the Bulletin of the New York Public Library, May 1953. 
Unrue, Darlene Harbour. 1997. Critical Essays on Katherine Anne Porter. Editor, Darlene Harbour Unrue. G. K. Hall and Company, New York. 

1944 short story collections
American short story collections